Lilium oxypetalum is a small to medium member of the Liliaceae family which grows to a height of 20–30 cm.  It is native to the N. W. Himalayas.
It grows as a single stem from a bulb, preferring a cool, shady position in moist, acid soil. The green stem is tinged with purple and supports a scattering of linear to lanceolate leaves, sometimes in a whorl beneath the flowers. The leaves are up to 7 cm long. The yellow, semi-pendant, unscented flowers are produced in early summer in ones or twos on slender stems. The flowers are shaped like a shallow bowl, up to 5 cm across and have a scattering of purple spots near the centre.

Oxypetalum (oxee`pet`alum) means sharp petalled.

The variety insigne produces purple flowers.

References

Flora of Nepal
oxypetalum
Taxa named by David Don
Taxa named by John Gilbert Baker